Adrian Gaxha (born 13 February 1984) is a Macedonian-Albanian singer, songwriter, producer, dancer and entrepreneur.

Life and career 

Adrian Gaxha was born on 13 February 1984 into an Albanian family in the city of Skopje, then part of the Socialist Republic of Macedonia, present-day North Macedonia. Gaxha discovered his passion for music at an early age and started to play the viola. He commenced his early music career in 2001 simultaneously with his participation in Nota Fest. There, he won first prize, the first time a newcomer won both, the jury and the audience votes. Within a short time, Adrian became one of the most popular singers in Macedonia and Albania and other Albanian-speaking territories. Until today he has recorded four albums, three in Albanian and one in Macedonian.

His performances usually include a lot of skillful dance choreography. He has also participated in festivals such as Videofest in Prishtina, Makfest in Štip, and has won the first prize at Ohrid Fest. In 2006, he finished second at the Macedonian national preselection for Eurovision, singing the song "Ljubov e" with the Macedonian-Romani legendary singer Esma Redzepova.

In 2008, Gaxha, alongside Tamara Todevska and Vrčak, won the pre-selection competition Skopje Fest and represented Macedonia in the Eurovision Song Contest 2008 with the song "Let Me Love You". After their performance in the second semi-final, the country failed to qualify for the grand final constituting its first overall non-qualification placing 10th with 64 points.
 
Since 2008, Gaxha has been focusing more in the Albanian-language songs and the Albanian market. He participated in Kënga Magjike 2012, with Florian Beqiri singing the song "Ngjyra e kuqe" (The red color) and placed Top 10. The song was an instant hit on the radios and on social media, especially on YouTube where the song counts more than 27 million views (As of 28 May 2017). After the festival, he released "Kjo zemër" (This heart), who received the similar success.

Discography

Albums 
 Luj, Luj, Luj (2003)
 Thuaj Mamit (2004)
 300 Godini (2008)
 Brenduar (2010)

Singles

As lead artist

References 

 

1984 births
21st-century Albanian male  singers
Albanian musicians from North Macedonia
Albanian record producers
Albanian songwriters
Albanian dancers
Eurovision Song Contest entrants for North Macedonia
Eurovision Song Contest entrants of 2008
Living people
21st-century Macedonian male singers
Macedonian record producers
Macedonian songwriters
Musicians from Skopje